Breakout is an arcade video game developed and published by Atari, Inc. and released on May 13, 1976. It was designed by Steve Wozniak, based on conceptualization from Nolan Bushnell and Steve Bristow who were influenced by the seminal 1972 Atari arcade game Pong. In Breakout, a layer of bricks lines the top third of the screen and the goal is to destroy them all by repeatedly bouncing a ball off a paddle into them. The arcade game was released in Japan by Namco. Breakout was a worldwide commercial success, among the top five highest-grossing arcade video games of 1976 in both the United States and Japan and then among the top three highest-grossing arcade video games of 1977 in the US and Japan. The 1978 Atari VCS port uses color graphics instead of a monochrome screen with colored overlay. 
 
While the concept was predated by Ramtek's Clean Sweep (1974), Breakout spawned an entire genre of clones. It was the inspiration for aspects of the Apple II computer and Taito's Space Invaders (1978). An official  sequel was released in 1978, Super Breakout, which eventually became the pack-in game for the Atari 5200 console in 1982. Super Breakout introduced multiple balls in play at once, which became a common feature in the genre. In 1986 the Breakout concept found new legs with Taito's Arkanoid, which itself spawned dozens of imitators. In Japan, the genre is known as block kuzushi ("block breaker") games.

Gameplay

Breakout begins with eight rows of bricks, with each two rows a different kinds of color. The color order from the bottom up is yellow, green, orange and red. Using a single ball, the player must knock down as many bricks as possible by using the walls and/or the paddle below to hit the ball against the bricks and eliminate them. If the player's paddle misses the ball's rebound, they will lose a turn. The player has three turns to try to clear two screens of bricks. Yellow bricks earn one point each, green bricks earn three points, orange bricks earn five points and the top-level red bricks score seven points each. The paddle shrinks to one-half its size after the ball has broken through the red row and hit the upper wall. Ball speed increases at specific intervals: after four hits, after twelve hits, and after making contact with the orange and red rows.

The highest score achievable for one player is 896; this is done by eliminating two screens of bricks worth 448 points per screen. Once the second screen of bricks is destroyed, the ball in play harmlessly bounces off empty walls until the player restarts the game, as no additional screens are provided.  However, a secret way to score beyond the 896 maximum is to play the game in two-player mode. If "Player One" completes the first screen on their third and last ball, then immediately and deliberately allows the ball to "drain", Player One's second screen is transferred to "Player Two" as a third screen, allowing Player Two to score a maximum of 1,344 points if they are adept enough to keep the third ball in play that long. Once the third screen is eliminated, the game is over.

The original arcade cabinet of Breakout featured artwork that revealed the game's plot to be that of a prison escape. According to this release, the player is actually playing as one of a prison's inmates attempting to knock a ball and chain into a wall of their prison cell with a mallet. If the player successfully destroys the wall in-game, their inmate escapes with others following.

Development
A precursor to Breakout was Clean Sweep, released by Ramtek in 1974. In that game, the player uses a paddle to hit a ball up towards a playfield of dots, which disappear as the ball moves through the dots; the goal is to achieve a clean sweep by erasing all the dots. Clean Sweep was one of the top ten best-selling arcade video games of 1974 and sold a total of 3,500 arcade cabinets.

Breakout, a discrete logic (non-microprocessor) game, was designed by Nolan Bushnell, Steve Jobs, and Steve Bristow, all three of whom were involved with Atari and its Kee Games subsidiary. Atari produced innovative video games using the Pong hardware as a means of competition against companies making "Pong clones". Bushnell wanted to turn Pong into a single player game, where the player would use a paddle to maintain a ball that depletes a wall of bricks. Bushnell was certain the game would be popular, and he and Bristow partnered to produce a concept. Al Alcorn was assigned as the Breakout project manager, and he began development with Cyan Engineering in 1975. Bushnell assigned Steve Jobs to design a prototype. Jobs was offered $750, with an award for every TTL (transistor-transistor logic) chip fewer than 50. Jobs promised to complete a prototype within four days.

Bushnell offered the bonus because he disliked how new Atari games required 150 to 170 chips; he knew that Jobs' friend Steve Wozniak, an employee of Hewlett-Packard, had designed a version of Pong that used about 30 chips. Jobs had little specialized knowledge of circuit board design but knew Wozniak was capable of producing designs with a small number of chips. He convinced Wozniak to work with him, promising to split the fee evenly between them if Wozniak could minimize the number of chips. Wozniak had no sketches and instead interpreted the game from its description. To save parts, he had "tricky little designs". Near the end of development, Wozniak considered moving the high score to the screen's top, but Jobs claimed Bushnell wanted it at the bottom; Wozniak was unaware of any truth to his claims. The original deadline was met after Wozniak worked at Atari four nights straight, doing some additional designs while at his day job at Hewlett-Packard.  This equated to a bonus of $5,000, which Jobs kept secret from Wozniak. Wozniak has stated he only received payment of $350; he believed for years that Atari had promised $700 for a design using fewer than 50 chips, and $1000 for fewer than 40, stating in 1984 that "we only got 700 bucks for it". Wozniak was the engineer, and Jobs was the breadboarder and tester. Wozniak's original design used 42 chips; the final, working breadboard he and Jobs delivered to Atari used 44, but Wozniak said: "We were so tired we couldn't cut it down".

The simplicity of the game created a problem when the copyright filing was denied because it "did not contain at least a minimum amount of original pictorial or graphic authorship, or authorship in sounds" and Atari appealed. In Atari Games Corp. v. Oman, then Court of Appeals Justice Ruth Bader Ginsburg found that the work was copyrightable.

Atari was unable to use Wozniak's design. By designing the board with as few chips as possible, he made the design difficult to manufacture; it was too compact and complicated to be feasible with Atari's manufacturing methods. However, Wozniak claims Atari could not understand the design and speculates "maybe some engineer there was trying to make some kind of modification to it". Atari ended up designing their own version for production, which contained about 100 TTL chips. Wozniak found the gameplay to be the same as his original creation and could not find any differences.

The arcade cabinet uses a black and white monitor, but the monitor has strips of colored cellophane placed over it so that the bricks appear to be in color.

Other versions

A software version of Breakout was written for the Atari 2600 by Brad Stewart. The game was published in 1978, but with only six rows of bricks, and the player is given five turns to clear two walls instead of three. In the Breakthru variant, the ball does not bounce off of the bricks but continues through them until it hits the wall. Atari had this term trademarked and used it in addition to Breakout to describe gameplay, especially in look-alike games and remakes.

Atari's 1977 dedicated Video Pinball console includes a Breakout game.

Reception
In October 1976, the annual RePlay chart listed Breakout as the fifth highest-earning arcade video game of 1976 in the United States, below Midway Manufacturing's Sea Wolf, Gun Fight and Wheels (Speed Race) by Taito and Midway, and Atari's Indy 800. Breakout was later the third highest-earning arcade video game of 1977 in the US, below Sea Wolf and Sprint 2, and the fifth highest-earning arcade video game of 1978 in the US.

Breakout was also a commercial success for Namco in Japan. On the first annual Game Machine arcade chart, Breakout was the fourth highest-grossing arcade video game of 1976 in Japan, below Taito's Ball Park (Tornado Baseball) and Speed Race DX and Sega's Heavyweight Champ. The following year, Breakout was Japan's third highest-grossing arcade game of 1977, below only two racing games, Namco's electro-mechanical game F-1 and Taito's video game Speed Race DX. In total, Breakout sold 15,000 arcade units worldwide by 1981.

The Atari 2600 version sold 256,265 units in 1980, making it the second best-selling home video game of 1980, below Space Invaders. Breakout went on to sell a total of 1,650,336 units by 1983, making it the ninth best-selling Atari game .

In 1989, Computer and Video Games reviewed the Atari VCS version, giving it a 24% score.

In 2021, The Guardian listed Breakout as the fourth greatest video game of the 1970s, below Galaxian, Asteroids and Space Invaders.

Legacy

Breakout was an influential game that had an impact on the video game and computer industries. Breakout spawned an entire genre of clones. Ten years later, the concept found new legs with Taito's 1986 Arkanoid, which itself spawned dozens of imitators. In Japan, the genre is known as block kuzushi ("block breaker") games. Breakout was also the basis and inspiration for certain aspects of the Apple II personal computer and Taito's arcade shoot 'em up game Space Invaders (1978).

Apple II influence
Breakout directly influenced Wozniak's design for the Apple II computer. He said: "A lot of features of the Apple II went in because I had designed Breakout for Atari. I had designed it in hardware. I wanted to write it in software now". This included his design of color graphics circuitry, the addition of game paddle support and sound, and graphics commands in Integer BASIC, with which he wrote Brick Out, a software clone of his own hardware game. Wozniak said in 1984:

Space Invaders influence
Tomohiro Nishikado cited Breakout as the original inspiration behind his hit Space Invaders (1978). He wanted to adapt the same sense of achievement and tension from destroying targets one at a time for a shooting game.

Re-releases and enhanced versions
The success of the game resulted in Super Breakout's release in 1978. It contains three separate game modes. The home ports include Breakout as a fourth mode, using the Super Breakout visual style.

Breakout 2000 for the Atari Jaguar adds a 3D playfield and additional features.

A 3D Breakout-inspired game was published simply as Breakout in 2000 for the PC and PlayStation by Hasbro Interactive's Atari Interactive subsidiary.

In 2011 Atari S.A. released an updated version of Breakout as Breakout Boost. The chief difference is the addition of improved graphics, power-ups, and unique brick types.

Another enhanced version of the game has been announced for release exclusively on the Intellivision Amico.

Breakout: Recharged
A revamped version of the game titled, Breakout: Recharged, released on February 10, 2022, for Nintendo Switch, PlayStation 4, PlayStation 5, Xbox One, Xbox Series X/S, Microsoft Windows and Atari VCS. It was developed by Adamvision Studios and SneakyBox.

Pilgrim in the Microworld
Pilgrim in the Microworld is an autobiography by David Sudnow detailing his obsession with Breakout. Sudnow describes studying the game's mechanics, visiting the manufacturer in Silicon Valley, and interviewing the programmers.

Easter eggs
The first-generation iPod Classic had an Easter egg where holding down the center button for a few seconds in the "About" menu caused Breakout to appear.

On the 37th anniversary of the game's release, Google released a secret version of Breakout accessible by typing "atari breakout" in Google Images. The image thumbnails form the breakout bricks, turn different colors, and after a ball and paddle appear the game begins.

References

1976 video games
Arcade video games
Atari 2600 games
Atari arcade games
Discrete video arcade games
Multiplayer and single-player video games
Namco arcade games
Paddle-and-ball video games
Vertically-oriented video games
Video games developed in the United States
Video games set in prison